Juan Camilo Mouriño Terrazo (1 August 1971 – 4 November 2008) was a Spanish-born politician affiliated with the National Action Party (PAN) and the Secretary of the Interior in the cabinet of President Felipe Calderón.

Personal life and education
Mouriño was born in Madrid to Carlos Mouriño, a Spanish immigrant to Mexico, who is the current president of  the Spanish football team Celta de Vigo.  Mouriño Terrazo studied economics at the University of Tampa and at the Universidad Autónoma de Campeche.

Political career
Mouriño served as local deputy in the State Congress of Campeche and as a federal deputy during the LVIII Legislature (2000–2003) of the Congress of the Union. In 2003 he unsuccessfully ran for municipal president (mayor) of Campeche.

His political career had been linked to Felipe Calderón: when Calderón served as Secretary of Energy Mouriño was designated under-secretary of Energy; during Calderón's presidential campaign he was the coordinator of the campaign first and then under-coordinator when Josefina Vázquez Mota became general-coordinator. In September 2006 he was designated head of Calderón's transition team and then on 1 December 2006, President Calderón appointed him as the Chief of the Presidency's Office.

On 15 January 2008, Mouriño was designated Secretary of the Interior.

Scandals
Juan Camilo Mouriño came under public scrutiny due to some contracts that appear to be signed by him as a representative of the companies owned by his father, while he was local deputy in Campeche, and later as an undersecretary of energy (under then energy secretary Calderón), both government related positions.

Andrés Manuel López Obrador showed also two new contracts that show that Mouriño could have incurred in abuse of power, since it seems he was still shareholder of the companies that benefited from these contracts.

Death

Mouriño was in a SEGOB-owned Learjet 45 that crashed into rush-hour Mexico City traffic on 4 November 2008, killing all eight people on board. The crash occurred in one of the most up-scale districts of Mexico City, and only 1 kilometre from the Presidential Residence, Los Pinos.

Secretary Mouriño had spent the day at an official function in the state of San Luis Potosí and left the state capital's international airport at 17:00 local time. There is a confirmed number of 14 fatalities: five passengers (including him), three crew (pilot, co-pilot and one stewardess), and six people at ground zero, plus about 40 injured, as a result of the incident. Also among those who died was Mexican politician and lawyer José Luis Santiago Vasconcelos, who was travelling with Mouriño.

Investigation

The two black boxes police found from the accident were sent to the United States to determine the cause(s) of the plane crash. In November 2009, the Mexican government announced that the main cause of the crash was turbulence encountered because of the pilot's failure to slow down in time and approaching too close to the wake turbulence of a 767.

References

External links
 
BBC, Profile: Juan Camilo Mourino
 The Times: Juan Camilo Mouriño: Mexican politician

|-

1971 births
2008 deaths
National Action Party (Mexico) politicians
Members of the Chamber of Deputies (Mexico)
Mexican people of Galician descent
Spanish emigrants to Mexico
Mexican Secretaries of the Interior
Victims of aviation accidents or incidents in Mexico
Members of the Congress of Campeche
20th-century Mexican politicians
21st-century Mexican politicians
University of Tampa alumni
Autonomous University of Campeche alumni
Deputies of the LVIII Legislature of Mexico